Cikalongwetan is a district (kecamatan) of West Bandung Regency, in West Java Province, Indonesia.

Villages  
 Cikalong
 Cipada
 Ciptagumati
 Cisomang Barat
 Ganjarsari
 Kanangasari
 Mandalamukti
 Mandalasari
 Mekarjaya
 Puteran
 Rende
 Tenjolaut
 Wangunjaya

Districts of West Java